The commune of Mwumba is a commune of Ngozi Province in northern Burundi. The capital lies at Mwumba.

References

Communes of Burundi
Ngozi Province